Langwedel is a railway station located in Langwedel, Germany. The station is located on the Bremen–Hanover railway and Uelzen–Langwedel railway. The train services are operated by Erixx and NordWestBahn. The station has been part of the Bremen S-Bahn since December 2010.

Train services
The following services currently call at the station:

Local services  Der Heidesprinter Bremen - Soltau - Uelzen
Bremen S-Bahn services  Bremen-Farge - Bremen-Vegesack - Bremen - Verden

References

Railway stations in Lower Saxony
Bremen S-Bahn